Hera Agathon, also called Isis, is a fictional character from the reimagined Battlestar Galactica series.

She is the first, and only, known Cylon-Human hybrid child to be born and she first appears, at birth, in the episode "Downloaded". She is the daughter of the Cylon Sharon "Athena" Agathon and human father Karl "Helo" Agathon. They name her "Hera" after the Colonial goddess. In the final plot development of the series, shown in the closing moments of the series finale, it is revealed that her Cylon-Human mtDNA is the starting point of the Homo sapiens of the Earth located in the Solar System, as she is the Mitochondrial Eve.

Background and details

The humanoid Cylons are as biological as they are technological and can potentially mate with humans and produce offspring. This fact seems to be part of the "plan" of the Cylons who want to repopulate the human colonies with a new generation of hybrid beings. Once the Cylons learn of Athena's pregnancy, they decide the child must be protected at all costs and thus have impact on the Cylon agenda in pursuing the refugee fleet. Hera is believed to be the only successful hybrid born, which is believed to be due to the love between her parents. Attempts at producing hybrids in "farms" on the occupied Colonies have all presumably failed in the early stages of gestation, if they ever got that far.

Fearing that Cylon spies within the fleet would try to kidnap Hera, the President Laura Roslin of the Fleet secretly orders Dr. Cottle to fake the child's death. Hera had been born with underdeveloped lungs and Cottle uses this fact as the cause of her death. Sharon, however, refuses to believe this and accuses Cottle of having murdered her child on Roslin's or Admiral Adama's orders.

Later, while Helo and Chief Tyrol scatter ashes into space that they believe are Hera's, Roslin and Cottle secretly meet on Colonial One and give Hera to a woman named Maya who had lost a child in a previous Cylon attack. Emphasizing the need for secrecy, Roslin's aide Tory Foster tells Maya that the baby's mother is an anonymous Pegasus officer who cannot care for the child due to political and religious reasons. Maya subsequently names the baby Isis.

After a year on planet New Caprica, Isis is still alive. She had been under the care of Maya, who works with Roslin in a New Caprica school. Roslin tries to keep Isis and her adoptive mother hidden (see Exodus, Part 1). However, Maya is killed during the evacuation of New Caprica (in the episode Exodus, Part 2). Hera is taken into the custody of Number Three.

During the race to Earth, Hera begins to get sick and her Cylon caretakers cannot determine what the problem is. During a Cylon diplomatic trip to Galactica, Boomer tells Hera's biological mother Sharon "Athena" Agathon that Hera is still alive and is sick (see The Eye of Jupiter). At Athena's request, her husband Helo shoots and kills her so that she can download to a new body in the Cylon fleet and attempt a rescue of her daughter (see Rapture). On download, Caprica-Six takes her to Hera, who is under Boomer's care. Hera appears to be comforted by her mother's presence.  As Caprica-Six observes, despite Boomer and Athena being biologically identical, Hera can apparently distinguish between them, and she has missed her real mother. However, Athena also discovers that Hera's belly is very hard, indicating a possible blockage in her bowels, and advocates that Hera be examined by a human doctor aboard Galactica. With help from Caprica-Six, Athena and Hera escape to Galactica, where Hera is presumably examined by Doc Cottle.

As a "hybrid", Hera/Isis possesses incredible regenerative properties. Some of her blood is donated to Laura Roslin, which helps treat her cancer to the point where she completely recovers (see "Epiphanies"). This fact leads to Laura's decision to not have Athena's fetus aborted as she had previously ordered. It is not yet known if Isis/Hera possesses any of the machine qualities of her mother, such as the fiberoptic neural pathways, and she is too young to determine if she has the superhuman physical prowess demonstrated by other humanoid Cylon models such as Leoben Conoy and Number Six. However, in Islanded in a Stream of Stars it is revealed that she possesses the Cylon ability to project (to inhabit an internally generated virtual environment and to share this environment with other Cylons).  As previously mentioned, Hera can distinguish her mother apart from the other Number Eights, but whether this is attributed to a Cylon inherited ability or to the emotional bond between a mother and her child is unknown.

In Someone to Watch Over Me, Hera gives Starbuck a drawing. Later, Starbuck realizes that the "stars" in Hera's drawing match up with the notes to "All Along the Watchtower" - the song that activated the Final Five. Hera is kidnapped by Boomer who arrives at the daycare dressed as her mother and then quickly drugs the little girl with a drink. Pretending to be Athena, Boomer smuggles Hera onto a Raptor inside a provisions container (Athena had planned to leave on an extended mission) and jumps away.

In the final episode, in which Hera is rescued and reunited with her mother, it is revealed that Hera is apparently the Mitochondrial Eve and lived 150,000 years before the present day. Her remains (described as being those of a "young woman") are recovered by the Smithsonian Institution in modern-day Tanzania.

See also
List of Battlestar Galactica (re-imagined series) episodes

External links
 Hera Agathon at Battlestar Wiki

Battlestar Galactica (2004 TV series) characters
Cylons